The Serbian SuperLiga Team of the Season is an annual award given to a set of 11 footballers in the top tier of Serbian football, the SuperLiga, who are seen to be the best 11 players of the calendar season.

Winners

2008–09
Source

2009–10
Source

2010–11
Source

2011–12
Source

2012–13
Source

2013–14
Source

2014–15
Source

2015–16
Source

2016–17
Source

2017–18
Source

2018–19
Source

References

External links
 The official website of the Serbian SuperLiga
 The official website of the Serbian Professional Footballers' Association

Team Of The Season
Serbian football trophies and awards